KWSH (1260 AM) is a radio station licensed to serve the community of Wewoka, Oklahoma. The station is owned by One Ten Broadcasting Group, Inc., and airs a country music format.

The station was assigned the call sign KSMI by the Federal Communications Commission on February 25, 1948. The station changed its call sign to KWSH on May 1, 1951.

Translators

References

External links
 Official Website
 FCC Public Inspection File for KWSH
 
 
 

WSH
Radio stations established in 1948
1948 establishments in Oklahoma
Country radio stations in the United States
Seminole County, Oklahoma